The protected areas of Kerala include a wide range of biomes, extending east from the coral reefs, estuaries, salt marshes, mangroves  beaches of the Arabian Sea through the tropical moist broadleaf forests of the Malabar Coast moist forests to the North Western Ghats moist deciduous forests and South Western Ghats moist deciduous forests to South Western Ghats montane rain forests on the western border of Tamil Nadu in the Western Ghats. Most protected areas throughout its 14 districts are under the stewardship of the Kerala Forest Department and like all other protected areas of India receive support from the Ministry of Environment and Forests (India).

Land coverage
Together the protected area totals , which cover 23.7% of the total forest area and 6.3% of the geographical area of Kerala State.

History
The first official action towards the conservation of wildlife and biodiversity in Kerala was taken in 1934 by the Maharaja of the Princely state of Travancore, Chithira Thirunal Balarama Varma, by declaring the forests around Periyar lake as a private game reserve to stop the encroachment of tea plantations. It was named Nellikkampatty Game Reserve and was consolidated as a wildlife sanctuary in 1950 after the political integration of India.

Biosphere reserves 
Nilgiri Biosphere Reserve (5,520 km2) established in 1986, includes parts of Wayanad, Nagarhole, Bandipur and Mudumalai, Nilambur, Silent Valley and Siruvani Hills in Tamil Nadu, Kerala and Karnataka.

Agasthyamalai Biosphere Reserve (3,500 km2) established in 2001, covers parts of Thiruvananthapuram, Kollam and Pathanamthitta Districts in Kerala and Tirunelveli and Kanyakumari Districts in Tamil Nadu.

National parks

1978 Eravikulam National Park, Idukki District, 97 km2
 
1982 Periyar National Park, Idukki District, 350 km2
 
1984 Silent Valley National Park, Palakkad District, 89.52 km2

2003 Mathikettan Shola National Park, Idukki District, 12.82 km2

2003 Anamudi Shola National Park in Idukki District is composed of Mannavan shola, Idivara shola and Pullardi shola, covering a total area of 7.5 km2.

2003 Pambadum Shola National Park, Idukki District, 1.318 km2

Proposed Karimpuzha National Park, 230 km2

Wildlife sanctuaries

Wildlife sanctuaries in Kerala include:
 Periyar Wildlife Sanctuary in Idukki District, established in 1950
 Neyyar Wildlife Sanctuary in Thiruvananthapuram District, elevation 80 m-1866 m, established in 1958:  reed brakes, ibex, lion tailed macaque, Indian elephant, Nilgiri langur, crocodile, shola birds, more than 150 endemics.
 Peechi-Vazhani Wildlife Sanctuary in Thrissur District, elevation 40 m-928 m, established in 1958
 Muthangha Wildlife Sanctuary in Wayanad District, elevation 800 m-1158 m, established in 1973: Indian elephant, Bengal tiger
 Parambikulam Wildlife Sanctuary in Palakkad District, elevation 459 m-1439 m, established in 1973: Nilgiri tahr, lion tailed macaque, gaur, Indian elephant
 Idukki Wildlife Sanctuary in Idukki District, elevation 600 m-1200 m, established in 1976: Indian elephant, sambar
 Peppara Wildlife Sanctuary in Thiruvananthapuram District, elevation 60 m-1717 m, established in 1983: lion tailed macaque, Indian elephant, shola birds
 Thattekad Bird Sanctuary in Idukki District, elevation 30 m-620 m, established in 1983: Birds
 Chimmony Wildlife sanctuary in Thrissur District, elevation 50 m-1116 m, established in 1984: Indian elephant, Bengal tiger
 Shenduruny Wildlife Sanctuary in Kollam District, elevation 120 m-1785 m, established in 1984: Myristica swamps, Bengal tiger, lion tailed macaque, shola birds, lesser predators, Gluta Travancorica trees
 Chinnar Wildlife Sanctuary in Idukki District, elevation 440 m -2300m, established in 1984: sandal forests, dry habitat species of animals and birds, Nilgiri tahr, Indian elephant
 Aralam Wildlife Sanctuary in Kannur District, elevation 60m-1598m, established in 1984: gaur, sambar, Nilgiri langur
 Mangalavanam Bird Sanctuary in Ernakulam District, almost at sea level, established in 2004
 Kurinjimala Sanctuary in Idukki District, elevation approx. 800 m-2550 m, established in 2006: Neelakurinji
 Ranipuram Wildlife Sanctuary proposed 2007 in Kasaragod district, approx.  is an integral part of Brahmagiri biosphere: shola forests, Indian elephants, Indian leopards, wild dogs, various species of birds, Malabar large-spotted civets, slender loris, macaque; no protection for this biodiversity area; illegal night hunting and poaching are main threats; attention of the concerned authorities is required to declare it a wildlife sanctuary.
 Karimpuzha Wildlife Sanctuary in Malappuram district. It was formed on July 3, 2020. It covers an area of 227.97 sq km.

Tiger reserves
1978 Periyar Tiger Reserve  777.54 km2   
Idukki District 1950. PTR notified in 1982  TE, MF, MD, P. West Coast TE 900 m-2019 m tiger, lion tailed macaque, black panther, elephant, smaller mammals.

Parambikulam Tiger Reserve is the second tiger reserve in Kerala. This is located in the district of Palakkad, Kerala, while the closest town for visitor access to this tiger reserve is Pollachi, in Tamil Nadu.

Mankulam forest division, between Aanakkulam, Mankulam and Edamalakkudy.

Zoos 
The Thiruvananthapuram Zoo is one among the best designed in Asia and is set amidst a woodland, lakes and lawns. It is one of the oldest in the country, established as an annexe to the museum in 1857.
The Thrissur Zoo is home to the wide variety of animals, reptiles and birds. Spread over an area of 13.5 acres of land, a natural history museum and an art museum are also enclosed within the same premises showcasing the socio-cultural heritage of the region. There is a special building which houses snakes also.

Reserve forests
Attappadi - The 249 km2 Attappadi Reserve Forest is an informal buffer zone conjoining Silent Valley National Park to the West. 81 km2 of this forest was separated to become most of the new 94 km2 Bhavani Forest Range which is part of the 147.22 km2 Silent Valley Buffer Zone.
Idamalayar Reserve Forest- surrounding the Edamalayar Dam to the north, east and a south-east, covering Thrissur and Ernakulam districts. Eravikulam National Park is to the south-east, and Mankulam Forest Division to the east.
A useful source is detailed Topographic Maps of India.

See also
Protected areas of West Bengal
Protected areas of Himachal Pradesh
Protected areas of Tamil Nadu

Notes

 
Kerala
Lists of tourist attractions in Kerala